Univille may refer to:

 Universidade da Região de Joinville (Univille), a university in Joinville, Brazil
 Univille , South Dakota, the fictional unincorporated town featured in Warehouse 13